William Kennedy Smith (born September 4, 1960) is an American physician and a member of the Kennedy family who founded an organization focused on land mines and the rehabilitation of landmine victims. He is known for being charged with rape in a nationally publicized 1991 trial that ended with his acquittal.

Early life, family, and education

Born at St. Elizabeth's Hospital in the Brighton neighborhood of Boston, William Kennedy Smith is the younger son of Stephen Edward Smith and Jean Kennedy Smith. His mother was the youngest daughter of Joseph P. Kennedy, Sr. and Rose Fitzgerald Kennedy. He is a nephew of President John F. Kennedy, Senator and Attorney General Robert F. Kennedy, and Senator Ted Kennedy. Smith has an elder brother, Stephen Edward Smith Jr., and two adoptive sisters, Kym and Amanda Smith.

He attended boarding school at Salisbury School in Salisbury, Connecticut. He received his undergraduate degree from Duke University; completed premedical post-baccalaureate studies at Bryn Mawr College; and, in 1991, received his M.D. degree from Georgetown University School of Medicine.

Personal life
Smith married Anne Henry, an arts fundraising consultant, on May 12, 2011 at Tilghman Island, Maryland. They have two children, India (born 2012) and Stephen (born 2013).

Legal accusations

1991 sexual assault charge
In 1991, Smith was tried and acquitted on a charge of rape, represented by Miami-based criminal defense attorney Roy Black in a trial that attracted extensive media coverage.

The incident began on the evening of Good Friday, March 29, 1991, when Smith, then 30 years old, was in a bar (named Au Bar) in Palm Beach, Florida, with his uncle, Senator Ted Kennedy, and his cousin Patrick J. Kennedy. There, Smith met Patricia Bowman, a 29-year-old woman and another young woman at the bar. According to a police affidavit by investigating police officers who interviewed Bowman, Smith asked for a ride back to a nearby house owned by the Kennedy family. Smith and Bowman then walked along the beach. Bowman told police that Smith then violently raped her. At about 4:00 am, she called two friends who retrieved her from the Kennedy compound and took her first to their home and then to her own home, where Bowman called a rape crisis center. 

A few hours later, she reported the incident to the police and was taken to a hospital for a rape kit examination, which documented sperm in her vagina, complaints of severe pain, and bruising. At trial, Smith said that he and Bowman had engaged in sex, but it had been consensual. Although three women, including a law student and a medical student, were willing to testify that Smith had sexually assaulted them in incidents in the 1980s that were not reported to the police, their testimony was excluded on the grounds that the pattern of behavior reported was not similar enough in its details to the Bowman case. 

When Bowman testified, her face was hidden by a large dot, but she chose to go public with her identity later. Smith was acquitted of all charges.  It took the jury less than 75 minutes to reach a not guilty verdict.

2004 civil action
In 2004, a former employee of the Center for International Rehabilitation (CIR) alleged that Smith had sexually assaulted her in 1999, and brought a civil action against him. Smith denied her charges, calling them "outrageous" and saying that "family and personal history have made me unusually vulnerable to these kinds of charges". Smith later resigned from the CIR. 

A spokesman for the organization later acknowledged that two separate federal sexual harassment claims against Smith, by former female employees of CIR, had been "settled amicably." On January 5, 2005, the court dismissed the employee's lawsuit.

Career and community involvement
Smith is the founder of Physicians Against Land Mines, a Chicago-based organization that advocates for an end to the use of land mines and assists persons injured by land mines. He also founded the Center for International Rehabilitation (CIR) in 1996. As of 2001, Smith was an adjunct instructor at Northwestern University Medical School and the Rehabilitation Institute of Chicago.

Smith considered running for Congress in the 2002 elections in Illinois, but decided against it.

As of 2011, Smith worked at MedRed, a Washington-based medical communications technology firm.

In 2014, Smith was elected to the Foggy Bottom Advisory Neighborhood Commission in Washington D.C.

See also
 Kennedy family tree

References

External links
 

1960 births
Living people
Politicians from Boston
Physicians from Massachusetts
American orthopedic surgeons
Kennedy family
People acquitted of rape
Politicians from Chicago
Duke University alumni
Georgetown University School of Medicine alumni
Northwestern University faculty